Roger Barrow was the coach for the South African national rowing team.

Barrow went to school at St. Andrew's College, Grahamstown.

See also
 Jake Green (rower)
 James Thompson (rower)

Notes and references

External links
Profile on worldrowing.com

Alumni of St. Andrew's College, Grahamstown
1975 births
Living people